The Cheng Kung-class frigates are eight guided-missile frigates in service in the Republic of China Navy (ROCN). They are based upon the U.S.  and built by China Shipbuilding Corporation in Kaohsiung, Taiwan under license throughout the 1990s as part of the Kuang Hua I project. These frigates served as the mainstay of the ROCN's area air defense capability prior to the acquisition of the Keelung (Kidd)-class destroyers in 2005. They are designated with the hull classification PFG (Patrol Frigate, Guided missile) rather than FFG (Frigate, Guided missile) used by the Oliver Hazard Perry class.

Background
The Kwang Hua I project came out of renewed relations between the Republic of China and the United States following the election of President Ronald Reagan. Reagan's government took a harder stance with mainland China and began joint defense projects with the Taiwanese military. Among them was the Kwang Hua I project which was part of a series of new surface warships being transferred from the United States or developed with their aid. Previously, the Republic of China Navy (ROCN) focused their naval efforts on anti-submarine warfare (ASW) due to mainland China's large submarine force. However, later developments of mainland China's surface fleet led to the arming of ROCN warships with surface-to-surface missiles (SSMs).

Design and description
The Cheng Kung class are based on the long-hulled version of the s of the United States Navy but with modifications. The class was intended to be built in two batches, with Batch I built to the standard design, and Batch II constructed to an improved design, incorporating new technologies. They are powered by two General Motors LM-2500 gas turbines turning one shaft connected to a controllable pitch propeller, creating . They also have two drop-down auxiliary propulsion units that create . The ships have four 1,000 kW diesel alternator sets for generating electricity. For additional stability in heavy seas, the ships have fin stabilizers. The frigates have a crew of 206 including 13 officers and an air group of 19.

The frigates were initially armed with eight Hsiung Feng II SSMs placed in two box launchers located atop the superstructure aft of the bridge. They also mounted a Mark 13 launcher for 40 RIM-66 Standard MR surface-to-air missiles. They have an OTO Melara /62 dual-purpose naval gun situated forward and two single-mounted Bofors /L70 guns. the 40 mm guns cannot be crewed while the 76 mm gun is firing due to blast effects. The Cheng Kung class mounts a /76 Phalanx close-in weapon system (CIWS) atop the hangar. Flanking the CIWS atop the hangar are two Type 75 20 mm/75 guns. For ASW, the frigates are armed with two triple-mounted  Mk 32 torpedo tubes for Mark 46 torpedoes.

The ships mount SPS-55 surface search radar, SPS-49(V)5 air search, Mark 92 fire control radar, STIR 24 missile fire control radar and Mark 90 Phalanx fire control radar. They are also equipped with DE 1160B hull-mounted sonar and are capable of using the ATAS towed passive sonar or the SQR-18A towed sonar. For electronic countermeasures, they mount the Chang Feng IV suite, which consists of the SLQ-32(V)5 radar warning system and the Sidekick radar jammer,  and the SLQ-25 Nixie torpedo decoy system.  The ships are equipped with the Prairie-Masker acoustic signature reduction system. The  ships came designed with a hangar and aft helicopter deck capable of operating two helicopters. However, the ROCN had difficulty acquiring helicopters capable of operating from the class until they obtained the S-70C Thunderhawk helicopters from the United States. Though capable of operating two, only one is kept housed aboard the frigates. The ships use the Recovery Assist, Secure and Traverse (RAST) haul-down system for their helicopters.

Upgrades

The displacement of the Cheng Kung-clas frigates has varied over time.

The Cheng Kung class was initially fitted with eight Hsiung Feng II SSMs, instead of the Harpoon missiles that the Oliver Hazard Perry class used. Ships of the class began refitting with four Hsiung Feng III (HF III) missiles, replacing four of the Hsiung Feng II missiles after the new HF III missiles entered production. In addition, the ROCN ordered Harpoon missiles for use by the Cheng Kungs in September 2000. After the US stopped supporting the SM-1 and their associated launch system support was taken up by NCSIST which also implemented an upgrade program for the missiles. Upgrades to the SM-1 include a better rocket motor and an active seeker.

The class's Mk 75 main guns have been upgraded and have an improved firing rate of 100 rounds a minute.

Construction
The Cheng Kung-class frigates were ordered from the China Shipbuilding Corporation of Kaoshuing, Taiwan, on 8 May 1989. They are named after historical Chinese commanders. The first two ships of the class were constructed from pre-fabricated sets supplied by Bath Iron Works, which also worked in conjunction with China Shipbuilding Corporation on the remaining frigates. Initially, only the first four hulls were intended to be part of the Batch I standard design. However, delays in the development of new surface-to-air missiles and electronics issues led to additional three hulls being built to the standard design. Eventually, the second batch was canceled in October 1994. An eighth hull was ordered in January 1999. The eighth ship was intended to be the first of the Batch II hulls, but it too was built to the standard design. Funding for the eighth ship only became in December 2000.

Ships in class

Additional Oliver Hazard Perry-class frigates
On November 5, 2012, Taiwan announced the U.S. government would sell them two additional Oliver Hazard Perry-class frigates that are about to be retired from the United States Navy for a cost of US$240 million. They were to be retrofitted and delivered in 2015. The Naval Vessel Transfer Act of 2013 was signed by President Barack Obama in 2014, allowing up to four of the frigates to be sold to Taiwan. Two ships were eventually selected and were reactivated by VSE Corporation and transferred to Taiwan on March 9, 2017. These ships would replace aging Chiyang-class (ex-) vessels. Both ships were commissioned into the ROCN on November 8, 2018.

See also
 F100-class frigate
 FREMM multipurpose frigate
 
 Type 054A frigate

Notes

Citations

References

External links

 PFG-2 Cheng Kung-class (Perry) Frigate - Globalsecurity
 Taiwan seeking Aegis destroyers from U.S.: report - Reuters

Frigate classes
 
 
Taiwan–United States military relations